Mahuika crater was a hypothesized impact crater named after the Māori god of fire. A 2017 survey of the purported site found no evidence supporting the existence of the crater.

Initial claims of discovery
The crater was reported and named by Dallas Abbott and her colleagues from the Lamont–Doherty Earth Observatory at Columbia University. Based on elemental anomalies, fossils, and minerals, which are interpreted to be derived from the impact, found in an ice core from the Siple Dome in Antarctica, it is argued that the impact which created the Mahuika crater occurred around 1443 AD, but other sources have placed the date as 13 February 1491 AD.

Some evidence suggests that the tsunami it caused was observed by Aboriginal Australians and entered into their oral traditions.

Doubts over existence 
In 2010 a paper was published in Marine Geology which critically analysed Abbott's claims regarding the origin of the Mahuika crater. The researchers determined that there was no evidence to indicate a comet created the crater, and therefore the possibility of an impact causing the tsunami was highly unlikely. 

A 2017 survey by the NIWA research vessel, RV Tangaroa, using a multibeam echosounder and a sub-bottom profiling system show no evidence for any crater-like feature in the position reported by Abbott and her colleagues. Instead, the site is typical flat continental shelf lying in 160 meters (528 ft) of water. Subsequent bathymetric data compilation and analysis, as part of The Nippon Foundation-GEBCO Seabed 2030 Project, shows no crater-life features on the continental shelf of southern New Zealand.

See also
 Burckle crater
 List of possible impact structures on Earth

References

External links 
 Abstract of Geological Society of America talk by Andrew K. Matzen on tektites from Mahuika crater
 …and the Fire from Heaven 2004 article disputing Mahuika impact origin of 15th century tsunami
 Expedition hunts giant meteor by S. Collins. Newspaper article about ongoing Mahuika impact research.

Further reading
Hostile Shores:Catastrophic Events in Prehistoric New Zealand and their Impact on Maori Coastal Communities, Bruce McFadgen, 2007, Auckland University Press. 

Geology of New Zealand
Possible impact craters on Earth
Holocene impact craters
Tsunamis in New Zealand
Geography of the New Zealand seabed